A sugar cookie is a cookie with the main ingredients being sugar, flour, butter, eggs, vanilla, and either baking powder or baking soda (depending on the type of sugar used).  Sugar cookies may be formed by hand, dropped, or rolled and cut into shapes. They are commonly decorated with additional sugar, icing, sprinkles, or a combination of these. Decorative shapes and figures can be cut into the rolled-out dough using a cookie cutter.

In North America, sugar cookies are popular during the holidays of Children's Day, Christmas, Halloween, Easter and Hanukkah.

History
Sugar cookies have a plain, classic flavor and have been made for centuries. The popularity and availability of sugar cookies rose when sugar became widely available. The sugar cookie is believed to have originated in the mid-1700s in Nazareth, Pennsylvania. German Protestant settlers created a round, crumbly and buttery cookie that came to be known as the Nazareth Cookie. 

Published recipes for the sugar cookie began to appear in the 1800s. Some of these early variations included sour cream or large amounts of milk, in addition or in place of the now-standard ingredients. In 1885, The Boston Globe published a recipe for sugar cookies that omitted liquid dairy ingredients, included baking powder, and had a ratio of one cup of sugar to one half cup of butter.

In the late 1950s, Pillsbury began selling pre-mixed refrigerated sugar cookie dough in US grocery stores, as a type of icebox cookie.

See also
List of cookies
Corn cookie
Sandies
Shortbread
Snickerdoodle

References

External links
 

Cookies